The 2018 season is Seinäjoen Jalkapallokerho's 11th competitive season, and fifth in the Veikkausliiga.

Season events
On 22 May, SJK announced that Aleksei Yeryomenko had replaced Tommi Kautonen after their poor start to the season.

Squad

Out on loan

Transfers

Winter

In:

Out:

In

Out

Released

Competitions

Veikkausliiga

League table

Results summary

Results by matchday

Results

Finnish Cup

Sixth Round

Knockout stage

Squad statistics

Appearances and goals

|-
|colspan="14"|Players from Kerho 07 who appeared:
|-
|colspan="14"|Players away from the club on loan:
|-
|colspan="14"|Players who left SJK during the season:

|}

Goal scorers

Clean sheets

Disciplinary record

References

2018
SJK